The 1927 New Hampshire Wildcats football team was an American football team that represented the University of New Hampshire as a member of the New England Conference during the 1927 college football season. In its 12th season under head coach William "Butch" Cowell, the team compiled an 0–7–1 record, and were outscored by their opponents, 134–50. After starting the season with a scoreless tie, the team lost each of their seven remaining contests. The team played its home games in Durham, New Hampshire, at Memorial Field.

Schedule

The 1927 game remains the last time that the Bowdoin and New Hampshire football programs have met.

Notes

References

New Hampshire
New Hampshire Wildcats football seasons
College football winless seasons
New Hampshire Wildcats football